Dangerous Pastime is a 1922 American silent drama film directed by James W. Horne and starring Lew Cody, Cleo Ridgely and Elinor Fair. Originally produced under the title Wait for Me it is also known as A Dangerous Pastime.

Cast
 Lew Cody as Barry Adams
 Cleo Ridgely as Mrs. Stowell
 Elinor Fair as Celia
 Ruth Cummings as Mrs. Gregor

References

Bibliography
 Connelly, Robert B. The Silents: Silent Feature Films, 1910-36, Volume 40, Issue 2. December Press, 1998.
 Munden, Kenneth White. The American Film Institute Catalog of Motion Pictures Produced in the United States, Part 1. University of California Press, 1997.

External links
 

1922 films
1922 drama films
1920s English-language films
American silent feature films
Silent American drama films
American black-and-white films
Films directed by James W. Horne
1920s American films